Nyukhcha is the name of several rural localities in Russia:
Nyukhcha, Arkhangelsk Oblast, a village in Nyukhchensky Selsoviet of Pinezhsky District of Arkhangelsk Oblast
Nyukhcha, Republic of Karelia, a selo in Belomorsky District of the Republic of Karelia